Un Nuevo Amor (A new love) is the sixteenth album from Mexican pop music singer and actress Lucero. It was released in 2002.

Is the fifth album recorded by Lucero with mariachi. On this project the singer had the collaboration of another two producers: Homero Patrón and Estefano, and along with longtime producer Ruben Fuentes, who produced her past four albums with mariachi, deliver eleven tracks, including covers like "Por Ti" (originally by Óscar Chávez), "Carta a Ufemia" (by Pedro Infante) and "Como Te Voy a Olvidar" (by Los Angeles Azules) and some brand new tracks by Estefano and Marco Flores.

It received a nomination for Best Ballad in the Lunas del Auditorio Awards, but lost to Rosana.

The disc certify gold record for 80,000 copies sold in Mexico.

Track listing
The album is composed by ten songs, all of them were arranged and composed by different composers.

Critical reception

Personnel
For the tracks "Volver Jamás", "Que Alguien me Diga", "Por Tí" and "Yo No Te Perdí"
 Producer and arranger: Homero Patrón
 Recorded and mixed: Mauricio Guerrero at Waterfront, Studio City, CA
 Engineer: Carlos Castro
 Vihuela: Jose Guadalupe Alfaro
 Guitar: Juan Carlos Giron
 Guitarron: Bernardino de Santiago
 Trumpet: Harry Kim and Ramon Flores
 Sax: Doug Norwine and Don Marklese
 Guitar solos: Ramon Satgmaro
 French horn: Wolfie and Jodie Glorry
 Keyboards: Homero Patron
 String: The Velvet Strings/Jorge Moraga
 Latin percussion: Rafael Padilla
 Backing vocals: Leyla Hoyle

For the tracks “Carta a Ufemia”, “Como te voy a olvidar” and “Me Duele la Piel”
 Producer: Rubén Fuentes
 Arrangements: Pepe Martinez (“Carta a Ufemia”), Manuel Cazarez (“Como te voy a olvidar”) and Ruben Fuentes (“Me duele la Piel”)
 Mariachi: Vargas de Tecalitlan
 Recording and mixing: Carlos Ceballos at Joel Solis Studio (Mexico)

For the tracks “A Quién Voy a Engañar” and “Lo He Intentado Todo”
 Producer: Estefano for Estefano Productions Group
 Arrangements and programming: Rey-Nerio
 Voice direction: Ruben Fuentes
 Recording engineer and overdubs: Andres Bermudez
 Percussion: Edwin Bonilla
 Mariachi “2000” by Cutberto Perez
 Trumpets: Jose Cutberto Perez, and Juan Guzman
 Violins: Pedro Garcia, Jose Vasquez, Petronila Godinez, Muricio Ramos, Eloy Guerrero, Sergio Guerrero, Benjamín Rosas, Hugo Santiago and Julio de Santiago
 Guitarron: Miguel Gonzalez
 Vihuela: Juan Carlos Giron
 Guitar: Juan Carlos Navarro
 Mastering: Michael Fuller at Fullersound, Miami
 Executive producer: Marco Rubi
 Direction A&R: Angel Carrasco
 Coordination A&R: Marco Cataño
 Photography: Adolfo Perez Butron
 Art direction: Pamela Postigo Uribe
 Design: Gustavio Cruz Castañeda

References

2002 albums
Lucero (entertainer) albums